De Pinna was a high-end clothier for men and women founded in New York City in 1885, by Alfred De Pinna (1831 - 1915), a Sephardic Jew born in England. They also sold menswear-inspired clothing for women that was finely tailored.  The flagship store was located at 642-50 Fifth Avenue and 52nd Street.  Alfred De Pinna retired from the company in 1912, and turned operations over to his son, Leo S., who ran the store until his retirement in 1939.  In 1950, De Pinna was bought by the Washington, D.C.-based store, Julius Garfinckel & Co. Branch locations operated at Eastchester, New York and Sunrise Center at Fort Lauderdale, Florida.  In 1969, the retail conglomerate Garfinckel, Brooks Brothers, Miller & Rhoads, Inc. closed the unprofitable De Pinna chain.

References

External links
Popartmachine.com Library of Congress (Gottscho-Schleisner Collection) Photograph of De Pinna Jewelry Department, March 2, 1951.
Popartmachine.com Library of Congress (Gottscho-Schleisner Collection) Photograph of De Pinna Main Sales Floor, March 2, 1951.
De Pinna at the Vintage Fashion Guild.

Defunct retail companies of the United States
Defunct department stores based in New York City
Clothing retailers of the United States
Companies based in New York City
Defunct companies based in New York (state)